The 2009 Open Barletta – Città della Disfida was a professional tennis tournament played on outdoor red clay courts. It was part of the 2009 ATP Challenger Tour. It took place in Barletta, Italy between 23 and 29 March 2009.

Singles entrants

Seeds

Rankings are as of March 16, 2009.

Other entrants
The following players received wildcards into the singles main draw:
  Daniele Bracciali
  Alessio di Mauro
  Thomas Fabbiano
  Gianluca Naso

The following players received entry from the qualifying draw:
  Alberto Brizzi
  Jonathan Eysseric
  Matwé Middelkoop
  Nick van der Meer

The following player received special exempt into the main draw:
  Thiemo de Bakker
  David Marrero

Champions

Men's singles

 Ivo Minář def.  Santiago Ventura, 6–4, 6–3

Men's doubles

 Rubén Ramírez Hidalgo /  Santiago Ventura def.  Pablo Cuevas /  Luis Horna, 7–6(1), 6–2

External links
Official website
ITF search 

Open Barletta - Citta della Disfida
Open Città della Disfida